Lokesh Ghosh is a Bengali film actor.

Filmography

 Bhagobaner Mathay Haat (2013)
 Bejanma (2010)
 Bolidaan (2010)
 Bhalobasa Jug Jug Jiyo (2009)
 Mejobabu (2009)
 Dadar Adesh (2005)
 Barud (2004)
 Sajani (2004)
 Kartabya (2003)
 Sabuj Sathi (2003)
 Sneher Protidan (2003)
 Sukh Dukkher Sansar (2003)
 Inquilaab (2002)
 Pratihinsa (2002)
 Prem Shakti (2002)
 Bidhatar Khela (2001)
 Rakhi Purnima (2001)
 Shesh Bichar (2001)
 Gariber Sansar (2000)
 Rupasi Dohai Tomar (2000)
 Gunda (1999)
 Jiban Niye Khela (1999)
 Khelaghar (1999)
 Krishna Kaberi (1999)
 Mastan Raja (1999)
 Niyoti (1999)
 Asal Nakal (1998)
 Banglar Badhu (1998)
 Lofar (1997)
 Matribhumi (1997)
 Sriman Bhutnath (1997)
 Mukhyamantri (1996)
 Naach Nagini Naach Re (1996)

Television 
 Mama Bhagne

References

External links
 
 Lokesh Ghosh in Gomolo

Indian male film actors
Living people
Male actors in Bengali cinema
Bengali Hindus
Indian Hindus
Year of birth missing (living people)